Colophon westwoodi is a species of beetle in the family Lucanidae. It is endemic to South Africa.

References

Lucaninae
Endemic beetles of South Africa
Taxonomy articles created by Polbot
Beetles described in 1932